Matías Nicolás Jadue González (born 16 May 1992) is a Palestinian footballer who plays as a forward for Guatemalan Primera División club Suchitepéquez.

International career
He was born and raised in Chile to parents of Palestinian descent. He played for Chile U-17 in the 2009 South American Under-17 Football Championship. He then switched over to the Palestine national football team and made his debut for them in a 3-2 loss to Saudi Arabia, where in he scored a goal.

International goals
Scores and results list Palestine's goal tally first.

Honours
Universidad Católica
 Primera División de Chile: 2010
 Copa Chile: 2011

References

External links
 
 

1992 births
Living people
Footballers from Santiago
Citizens of the State of Palestine through descent
Palestinian footballers
Palestine international footballers
Chilean footballers
Chilean people of Palestinian descent
Chilean emigrants to Palestine
Club Deportivo Universidad Católica footballers
Deportes La Serena footballers
C.D. Antofagasta footballers
Deportes Santa Cruz footballers
PKNS F.C. players
Matias Jadue
Matias Jadue
Ho Chi Minh City FC players
Rangers de Talca footballers
Everton de Viña del Mar footballers
C.D. Suchitepéquez players
Chilean Primera División players
Segunda División Profesional de Chile players
Malaysia Super League players
Matias Jadue
V.League 1 players
Primera B de Chile players
Primera División de Ascenso players
Palestinian expatriate footballers
Chilean expatriate footballers
Expatriate footballers in Malaysia
Palestinian expatriate sportspeople in Malaysia
Chilean expatriate sportspeople in Malaysia
Expatriate footballers in Thailand
Palestinian expatriate sportspeople in Thailand
Chilean expatriate sportspeople in Thailand
Expatriate footballers in Vietnam
Chilean expatriate sportspeople in Vietnam
Expatriate footballers in Guatemala
Chilean expatriate sportspeople in Guatemala
Association football forwards